Chaplain (Major General) Cecil Roland Richardson, USAF (born c. 1947), retired as the 16th Chief of Chaplains of the United States Air Force, effective June 1, 2012, with an official retirement ceremony on May 30, 2012. He was appointed to that assignment on May 28, 2008.

Richardson, a member of the Assemblies of God, was the first Pentecostal minister to be promoted to flag officer rank in the U.S. Air Force. He has said that his role was to be "a pastor to Christians, and a chaplain to all."

Early military career
Before ordination, Richardson served in the Air Force as an enlisted man, working as a Russian interpreter and intercept operator.

Education
Richardson's educational background includes:
1973 Bachelor of Arts degree in Biblical studies, Evangel University, Springfield, Mo.
1976 Master of Divinity degree in Hebrew studies, Trinity Evangelical Divinity School, Deerfield, Ill.
1981 Squadron Officer School, by correspondence
1988 Air Command and Staff College, by correspondence
1992 Air War College, by seminar

Assignments
Richardson served as Deputy Air Force Chief of Chaplains from April 2004-May 2008, and began serving as Chief of Chaplains May 2008. Prior to these positions, his assignments included:

Enlisted assignments
June 1966 - May 1967, Russian language student, Syracuse University, N.Y.
June 1967 - August 1967, electronic intercept student, Goodfellow AFB, Texas
August 1967 - December 1968, Russian intercept operator, Karamursel Air Base, Turkey
January 1969 - January 1970, Russian interpreter, National Security Agency, Fort George G. Meade, Md.

Chaplain assignments
April 1977 - June 1980, Protestant chaplain, 314th Tactical Airlift Wing, Little Rock AFB, Ark.
June 1980 - July 1981, senior Protestant chaplain, 5073rd Air Base Group, Shemya AFB, Alaska
July 1981 - July 1983, Protestant chaplain, 1606th Air Base Wing, Kirtland AFB, N.M.
July 1983 - July 1984, Air Staff Training officer, Office of the Chief of Chaplains, Bolling AFB, D.C.
July 1984 - June 1986, senior Protestant chaplain, 410th Bombardment Wing,  K.I. Sawyer AFB, Mich.
June 1986 - June 1988, installation staff chaplain, 7276th Air Base Group,  Iraklion Air Station, Greece
June 1988 - July 1991, Chief, Education and Professional Development Division, Office of the Command Chaplain, Air Mobility Command, Scott AFB, Ill.
July 1991 - June 1993, senior chaplain, 62nd Airlift Wing, McChord AFB, Wash.
June 1993 - August 1995, assignments officer, Office of the Chief of Chaplains, Bolling AFB, D.C.
August 1995 - February 1997, Executive Director, Armed Forces Chaplains Board, Office of the Under Secretary of Defense, the Pentagon, Washington, D.C.
February 1997 - June 2000, Command Chaplain, U.S. Central Command, MacDill AFB, Fla.
July 2000 - June 2003, Command Chaplain, Air Combat Command, Langley AFB, Va.
July 2003 - April 2004, Director, USAF Chaplain Service Institute, Maxwell AFB, Ala.

Awards and military decorations
Among Richardson's numerous military awards and decorations are:

See also
Chiefs of Chaplains of the United States
Armed Forces Chaplains Board

References

Chiefs of Chaplains of the United States Air Force
United States Air Force generals
Living people
American Pentecostal pastors
Deputy Chiefs of Chaplains of the United States Air Force
Recipients of the Air Force Distinguished Service Medal
Recipients of the Legion of Merit
Recipients of the Defense Superior Service Medal
Year of birth missing (living people)